The Beijing–Hong Kong high-speed train is a high-speed train service operated by China Railway Guangzhou Group (CR Guangzhou) on Beijing–Guangzhou–Shenzhen–Hong Kong HSR in China.

History

The G79/80 service dates back to 26 December 2012, when the Beijing–Zhengzhou section of the Beijing–Guangzhou–Shenzhen–Hong Kong HSR was opened.

On 30 January 2020 the service was suspended due to the COVID-19 pandemic.

On 28 March 2020, the service has restored between Beijing West and Shenzhen North, but service to West Kowloon station is still suspended.

Operations

The service operates on a daily basis under the following timetable:

Train formation
The service is operated by 16-car CR400AF-A trainsets with the formation shown below. Car 3-14 are for second class seats with 3+2 seating. The dining car is located in Car 9 and wheelchair space is provided on Car 8. Car 2 and 15 are first class car with 2+2 seating. Car 1 is for business seats only and Car 16 is a hybrid of first class seats and business seats.

Previously used rolling stocks
 16-car CRH380BL (from 26 December 2012 to early 2016)
 16-car CRH380AL (from early 2016 to October 2017) 
 Double-headed 8-car CR400AF (from October 2017 to June 2018)

References

China Railway passenger services
Passenger rail transport in China
Passenger rail transport in Hong Kong
Railway services introduced in 2018